Copelatus distinctus is a species of diving beetle. It is part of the genus Copelatus of the subfamily Copelatinae in the family Dytiscidae. It was described by Aubé in 1838.

References

distinctus
Beetles described in 1838